"Mr. Reggae" is a song by Hawaiian musician Billy Kaui of the band Country Comfort, released on his debut album Billy Kaui in 1977. The song was a hit for New Zealand band L.A.B. after they released as the lead single from their album L.A.B. V in November 2021, reaching number three in New Zealand, and winning the Aotearoa Music Award for Single of the Year.

Background and composition

"Mr. Reggae" was a reggae-influenced song released by Hawaiian musician Billy Kaui in 1977, a year after the break-up of his band Country Comfort. It is the first known commercial recording by a Hawaiian musician featuring reggae influences, pre-dating the Jawaiian reggae movement which became popular in the early 1980s. Kaui released the song as a single in Japan in 1978, through the Nippon Phonogram label.

Brad Kora of the New Zealand band L.A.B. suggested that the band record a cover of the song, inspired by jam sessions the band members held at beaches near their hometown of Whakatāne. Brothers Stuart and Brad Kora felt that the song was an important part of their upbringing, and would often performed the song during jam sessions while they were in the band Kora. The recorded their cover in mid-2021, and incorporated wah-wah pedal guitar into the track.

Release

The song was released as a single by L.A.B. on 26 November 2021, one month before the album L.A.B. V. In June 2022, a live rendition of "Mr Reggae" was released as a part of the Live at Massey Studios extended play.

Critical reception

Alex Behan of Stuff described L.A.B.'s cover as a "nicely executed" "straightforward slice of wah-guitar wizardry that feels instantly familiar". Tim Gruar of Ambient Light Blog felt the song was a "stock standard dancehall number" that was "pretty much the meat and potatoes for this ban...a little under-whelming and run-of-the-mill".

At the 2022 Aotearoa Music Awards, "Mr Reggae" won the Single of the Year award.

Credits and personnel

Ara Adams-Tamatea – bass, co-engineer, co-producer, synths
Miharo Gregory – backing vocals, FX, organ, piano solo
Billy Kaui – lyrics, songwriting
Brad Kora – drums, producer
Stuart Kora – bubble, piano
L.A.B. – arrangement
Reiki Ruawai – guest vocals
Joel Shadbolt – acoustic guitar, backing vocals, vocals

Charts

Weekly charts

Year-end charts

Certifications

References

2021 singles
1978 singles
1977 songs
Hawaiian music
L.A.B. songs